Hamida Banu Shova (born 2 February 1954) is the founder and chairperson of Queens University, Bangladesh. She established this university in 1996.

Career
Shova is a former Jatiya Sangsad member. She served as female MP for constituency (Nilphamari-1) from 2001 to 2006 under the banner of the Awami League. She is nominated Assistant Secretaries of Sub-Committee of Bangladesh Awami League.

References

1954 births
Living people
Bangladeshi businesspeople
Awami League politicians
Women members of the Jatiya Sangsad
8th Jatiya Sangsad members
21st-century Bangladeshi women politicians